Peniasi Malimali (born 8 December 1996) is a Fijian rugby union player who plays for the  in Super Rugby. His playing position is wing. He was named in the Chiefs squad for the 2023 Super Rugby Pacific season. He was also a member of the  2022 Bunnings NPC squad.

Malimali made a number of stand out performances during the 2022 Bunnings NPC, including scoring twice against . He has been compared to  star Vinaya Habosi who had a breakout campaign during the 2022 Super Rugby Pacific season.

References

External links
itsrugby.co.uk profile

1996 births
Fijian rugby union players
Living people
Rugby union wings
Counties Manukau rugby union players
Chiefs (rugby union) players